Mannan Magal (lit. King's Daughter) is a Tamil language historical novel written by Sandilyan. The story is based on ancient Tamil poetry. It is a love story set around 1019 CE, focusing on the Rajendra Chola I#Expedition to the Ganges and politics in the Vengi Kingdom.

Plot summary
The plot is about Karikalan who sets his journey to find his birth identity who doen't know about anything about his parents. He goes to vengi kingdom & meets Niranchana devi accidentally where he learns about the horrifying political clutches around her & her first younger brother Rajaraja Narendra. Vengi King Vimaladithyan has 3 children from his three wives, eldest daughter Niranchana  of, first son  Rajaraja Narendra of Kundavai - sister of Chola Emperor Rajendra Cholan I, second son Vishnuvarshan of  - sister of  Jayasimha II  .
Vengi is under undeclared war between Niranchana who want to strengthen throne for  Rajaraja Narendra against Jayasimha II   who want to swipe elder & have a strong hold at Vengi with his nephew Vishnuvarshan, so as to stop & oppose chola invasion & dominance. Karikalan decides to dedicate for Niranchana and her mission. On his journey to save Niranchana Devi & to get his own identity he was put into positions to manage & tackle by-the-times most dangerous & intelligent men like Brammaraayar, Jayasimha II, Araiyan Rajarajan. On course of time, they eventually fall for one another

Story wide spreads from Vengi and take him to his guardian father figure - Araiyan Rajarajan, who & some other key members who are bounded by an oath not to reveal Karikalan's identity under any circumstances. Even though Karikalan was not able to learn about his identity, he was treated as a great warrior and due to his wit & intelligence quickly gets a position in War Council which is headed by Vallavaraiyan Vandiyadevan for Ganges Expedition of Cholas.

Karikalan's analytical & logical skills, wit & tricky plays, out smartness help  Araiyan Rajarajan's war stargerties Cholas to win/cross kingdoms which are on the way of their expedition with less/minimum effort  & loss, which includes taking  Rajaraja Narendra from throne of Vengi. This brings hatredness of Niranchana towards Karikalan.

Six Kingdoms which Chola conquered:

At end of Ottara war, its king Prathapaduran - one of the oath keeper broke it to Karikalan [...to be continued]

Characters
 Karikalan (fictional)
 Niranchana Devi (fictional)
 Sengamala Selvi (fictional)
 Rajendra Chola
 Rajaraja Narendra
 Vallavaraiyan Vandiyadevan
 
 Araiyan Rajarajan
 Brammaraayar
 Thuravi alias Jeyavarman (fictional)
 Jayasimha II

Tamil-language literature
Novels set in the Chola Empire
Indian historical novels
Tamil novels
Novels by Sandilyan
Indian historical novels in Tamil
Novels set in Tamil Nadu